The United States Department of Defense held seven French detainees in Guantanamo.  All of those French detainees were released from the Guantanamo Bay Detention Camp by 2005.

A total of 778 detainees have been held in extrajudicial detention in the Guantanamo detention camps, in Cuba since the camps opened on January 11, 2002.  The camp population peaked in 2004 at approximately 660.  Only nineteen new detainees, all "high value detainees" have been transferred there since the United States Supreme Court's ruling in Rasul v. Bush.  

The last French citizens were repatriated in March 2005.
Six of the men faced charges in France upon repatriation.
Five of the men were convicted.
Their convictions were overturned, on appeal, in February 2009.
On February 17, 2010, the Court of Cassation, the highest court in France, ordered a re-trial of the five men.

French detainees in Guantanamo

References

Lists of Guantanamo Bay detainees by nationality
France–United States relations